MAK College of Pharmacy (MAKP) is an Indian private non-minority technical institute located in Telangana, India, affiliated to Jawaharlal Nehru Technological University, Hyderabad (JNTUH), India. It is approved by the All India Council for Technical Education and registered by Pharmacy Council of India (PCI)

History
The saga of the MAK College of Pharmacy started with the college's establishment by Mr. Zakir Osman in  2011 at Chilkur Village, Moinabad, Rangareddy district, in the suburbs of Hyderabad. It offers under graduate & Post Graduate programmes in Pharmacy, Pharmacology, Pharmaceutics and Pharma analysis & Quality Assurance.

Campus
The campus has an area of 2 acres.

Admission process
Students are admitted into Under Graduate Pharmacy and Post Graduate programmes under the following categories.
 EAMCET category
 PGECET category
 Non-resident Indian or Management Quota

The government of Andhra Pradesh allows admission of diploma holders into 2nd year under "lateral entry scheme" to the extent of 10% of intake to each of the branches on a supernumerary basis.

R&D cell of Pharmaceutics Department
The role of the Research & Development Cell is to enhance research and development activities. The cell periodically reviews the research work carried out by the faculty, while emphasizing the importance of industry–institute interaction, and facilitates taking up project and consultancy work.

Technical Fests
The Pharmacology Department organises a two-day national level Pharmaceutical sciences symposium in the name of SANGUINES every year in February or March. At the end of the second day of fest, a cultural fest is conducted.

References

External links
 MAK College of Pharmacy official website 

Pharmacy schools in India
All India Council for Technical Education
Ranga Reddy district
Educational institutions established in 2011
2011 establishments in Andhra Pradesh